Chicón or Chicon (possibly from Quechua ch'iqu workable stone) is a mountain in the Urubamba mountain range in the Andes of Peru, about  high. It is located in the Cusco Region, Calca Province, Calca District and in the Urubamba Province, Urubamba District. It is situated northeast of the town of Yucay, southeast of Pumahuanca and southwest of the Sirihuani. The southern part of Chicón is also known as Illahuamán. It belongs to the Yucay District. It reaches .

References

External links 

Mountains of Peru
Mountains of Cusco Region